The Church of  St. Simeon the Canaanite is located near the town of New Athos in Gudauta District, Abkhazia/Georgia, dating from the 9th or 10th century.
Not to be confused with St Simon the Canaanite Basilica in Psirtskha village.

History 
The church is dedicated to St. Simon the Canaanite, who, according to the 11th-century Georgian Chronicles, preached Christianity in Abkhazia and Egrisi and died and was buried at the town of Nicopsia, to the north of Abkhazia. A nearby grotto is associated by popular legends with the site of martyrdom of St. Simon.

The design of the extant church dates to the 9th or 10th century and is influenced by the Byzantine and Georgian art traditions, but the church site seems to be two centuries older. At the time when the Georgian historian Dimitri Bakradze visited it in the 1850s, the church was abandoned, but still standing except for the collapsed dome. The church suffered greatly when the local landlord, Major Hasan Margani removed its blocks of stone for the construction of his own mansion. Later, in the 1880s, the church was reconstructed, using blocks of white hewn stone, to its current state. The church is adorned with images of Christian symbols such as a fish, lion, and cross curved in relief.

Current condition
Georgia has inscribed the church on its list of cultural heritage and treats it as part of cultural heritage in the Russian-occupied territories with no known current state of condition.

References 

Churches in Abkhazia
Immovable Cultural Monuments of National Significance of Georgia